Eoin McLaughlin is a bestselling Irish children's writer. His books have been translated into over 25 languages and described by The Times as "an important historic record of the time".

The Hug 
His debut picture book The Hug (illustrated by Polly Dunbar) was named a 'Book of the Year' by The Guardian and shortlisted for the CBI Book of the Year Awards. It has been translated into over 25 languages.

The follow-up While We Can't Hug has been widely used around the world to help children during the COVID-19 lockdowns. It was shortlisted for the Irish Book Awards and nominated for the Chartered Institute of Library and Information Professionals Kate Greenaway Medal. It was also included in The Guardian's 'Children's Books of the Year' and read by Mr Tumble on the BBC on Christmas Day.

A third book called The Longer the Wait, the Bigger the Hug came out in June 2021.

Other books 
Secret Agent Elephant is illustrated by Ross Collins and published by Hachette Book Group. Their second book, Inspector Penguin, has "a plot worthy of Agatha Christie" according to The Guardian. 

The Case of the Missing Cake is illustrated by Marc Boutavant and published by Walker Books. It featured in The Guardian'''s best new children's books of the month. 

 Channel 4 
McLaughlin is a creative director at Channel 4, where he has worked on the Paralympics, Derry Girls and The Great British Bake Off.

Biography
McLaughlin was born in Dublin and now lives in Surrey with his partner and their son.

Bibliography
 The Hug, (illustrated by Polly Dunbar) Faber 2019. 
 Secret Agent Elephant, (illustrated by Ross Collins) Hachette 2019. The Case of the Missing Cake, (illustrated by Marc Boutavant) Walker 2020. This is NOT a Bedtime Story, (illustrated by Robert Starling) Pavilion 2020. While We Can't Hug, (illustrated by Polly Dunbar) Faber 2020 The Longer the Wait, the Bigger the Hug'', (illustrated by Polly Dunbar) Faber 2021

References 

Living people
Year of birth missing (living people)
Irish children's writers
21st-century Irish writers
Writers from Dublin (city)
British children's writers